The Tenants are an Australian pub rock band from Bathurst, New South Wales, which formed in 1998. The band won a regional final for Triple J Unearthed in 1998 with the song, "You Shit Me to Tears", which was listed at No. 3 on the Triple J Hottest 100, 1999 radio listeners' poll. They issued one full length album, Everything You Know Is Wrong (27 January 2006).

Members 

 Jeff Moore (a.k.a. JJ LaMoore) – bass guitar (1998–present)
 Jason Rooke (a.k.a. Jase the Ace) – vocals, guitar (1998–present)
 Anthony Layton (a.k.a. Ant Layton) – drums (2002–present)
 Dean Bakota (a.k.a. Deanie B) – drums (1998–2002)
 Gregory J Thorsby – guitar (1998–2001)

Discography

Albums

Extended plays

Singles

References

External links

 The Tenants (Facebook Account)
 The Tenants (YouTube)
 The Tenants (Bandcamp)
 The Tenants official website The Tenants official website will be back up Mid 2020
 The Tenants ReverbNation 

Australian rock music groups